Molik Jesse Khan (born 8 April 2004) is a Trinidadian footballer who plays as a midfielder for Minnesota United FC 2 and the Trinidad and Tobago national football team.

Early life and education 

Khan played for Naparima College at high school, where he won the Trinidad and Tobago National High School Championships for three consecutive years. Khan and Naparima College finished seasons unbeaten, breaking long standing records in the Trinidad and Tobago youth football circuit.

Khan then enrolled at 13-time national soccer champions St Benedict's Preparatory school in Newark, New Jersey the former high school of American soccer legends Claudio Reyna, Gregg Berhalter and Tab Ramos. In his only season at St Benedict's, Khan led the team to an unbeaten New Jersey State Championship making him a high school champion in a second country.

Career

Club 
Khan made his professional debut for W Connection at age 15, becoming one of the youngest professional footballers in the history of TT Pro League. A few weeks after his professional debut Khan scored in the TT Pro League becoming one of the league's youngest-ever goal scorers. In April 2021, Khan was offered a two-week trial at Major League Soccer's New York Red Bulls and stayed with the club for four months.

On the eve of his 18th birthday, Khan signed a multi-year contract with Minnesota United in Major League Soccer and will play primarily with their MLS Next Pro team, Minnesota United FC 2.

International
Khan has represented Trinidad and Tobago at the youth level. Because of Khan's efforts in the TT Pro League he was called up by new Trinidad and Tobago national team head coach and ex-England international, Terry Fenwick, for his first senior team camp. At 16, Khan was the youngest player selected.

Following Trinidad and Tobago's elimination from the 2022 World Cup Trinidad and Tobago interim coach, Angus Eve, named 17-year old Khan as the youngest member of Trinidad and Tobago's 26-man squad for the 2021 Gold Cup qualifiers in Miami, Florida. Eve who is Trinidad and Tobago's most capped player has described Khan as "the future of Trinidad and Tobago football". On the 21st of January 2022, aged just 17 years-old, Khan made his senior international debut for Trinidad and Tobago against Bolivia during an international friendly in Sucre, Bolivia. Khan entered the game at the start of the second half.

18-year-old Khan was then selected as part of Trinidad and Tobago's 26-man Concacaf Nations League squad to play games against Nicaragua, St Vincent and the Grenadines and the Bahamas during the June 2022 FIFA international window.

At the 2022 CONCACAF U20 Championships in Honduras,  Khan was named captain of the Trinidad and Tobago U20 team and was the only professional player on the team's roster. Khan played the full 90 minutes in all four of the teams' games scoring twice against Suriname and Costa Rica.

References

External links
 

Living people
Trinidad and Tobago international footballers
2004 births
Trinidad and Tobago footballers
Association football midfielders
TT Pro League players
MLS Next Pro players